Fort Anderson can refer to:
Fort Anderson (Kentucky) ; A Union fort used in the American Civil War and site of the Battle of Paducah, Kentucky
Fort Anderson (North Carolina) ; A Confederate fort used in the American Civil War
Fort Anderson Located across from New Bern, North Carolina and the site of the Battle of Fort Anderson
Fort Anderson (California) ; Fort Anderson California State Military Department
Fort Anderson (Tennessee) ; Site of a state militia encampment during the Coal Creek War
Fort Anderson — a Hudson's Bay Company post on the Anderson River (Northwest Territories), Canada